The 2008 Carolina Challenge Cup was a four-team round robin pre-season competition hosted by the Charleston Battery. The San Jose Earthquakes won their second title.

Teams
Four clubs competed in the tournament:

Standings

Scorers
2 goals
 Randi Patterson (Charleston Battery)
 Kei Kamara (San Jose Earthquakes)
1 goal
 Ramiro Corrales (San Jose Earthquakes)
 Jeff Cunningham (Toronto FC)
 Glinton (San Jose Earthquakes)
 Jason Hernandez (San Jose Earthquakes)
 David Kenga (Charleston Battery)
 Kevin Mesa (New York Red Bulls)
 Darren Spicer (Charleston Battery)
 John Wolyniec (New York Red Bulls)

See also 
 Carolina Challenge Cup
 Charleston Battery
 2008 in American soccer

External links
 2008 Carolina Challenge Cup
 Carolina Challenge Cup 2008 Schedule Out, Tickets On Sale Now
 CCC 2008 Matchday 1
 CCC 2008 Matchday 2
 CCC 2008 Matchday 3

Carolina
2008
Carolina Challenge
Carolina Challenge